This is a list of the youngest individuals elected or appointed to a state legislature in the United States.

Overview
In 2014, the National Conference of State Legislatures estimated that 5% of state legislators were under the age of 30.

List

Territorial legislators

References

Youngest
State legislators
Youngest